A list of films produced in Egypt in 1934. For an A-Z list of films currently on Wikipedia, see :Category:Egyptian films.

External links
 Egyptian films of 1934 at the Internet Movie Database
 Egyptian films of 1934 elCinema.com

Lists of Egyptian films by year
1934 in Egypt
Lists of 1934 films by country or language